Mahinder Watsa (11 February 1924 – 28 December 2020) was an Indian sexologist known for his sex columns in newspapers and magazines. His contributions to promote sex education in India earned him the 2014 Dr. Ved Vyas Puri Award.

Life and work
Mahinder Watsa's father was a military physician. Watsa was Punjabi. When he was around 7 years old, his family spent some time in Rangoon.

During his time at a medical college in Mumbai, Watsa stayed with friends of his family. Through them, he met his future wife, Promila. Despite coming from different backgrounds and castes (he was Punjabi, she was originally from Sindh), and going against a tradition of arranged marriages, the two wed after being friends for a number of years. The couple had a son and lived for a while in the 1950s in the United Kingdom, during which time Watsa worked as a hospital houseman and registrar. The family returned to India after his father fell ill and Watsa found work in Glaxo as a medical officer, while simultaneously running a private practice as a gynecologist and obstetrician.

Watsa began a career as a columnist in the 1960s when, in his late 30s, he was asked to start writing a medical advice column for a women's magazine. He continued authoring health columns for several women's magazines, such as Femina, Flair, and Trend, into the 1970s until he encountered resistance from an editor who insisted upon censoring queries about sexual health. Watsa however maintained his writing through numerous alternative outlets including men's magazines (such as 'Fantasy') and, later, websites.

One of the readers of the Femina column had filed an obscenity lawsuit claiming that the publishers were fabricating the letters to increase readership. The editor, Sathya Saran, managed to convince the judge to drop the case by delivering a sack of unopened letters to him.

Through his work as a columnist he became aware of the lack of sex education in India. In 1974, while working as a consultant for the Family Planning Association of India (FPAI), Watsa proposed that a sexual counselling and education program should be introduced. Despite oppositions, FPAI accepted his advice and started India's first sex education, counselling and therapy centre. In 1976, he organised India's first workshop on human sexuality and family life. The workshop was also addressed by Ashok Row Kavi, a notable LGBT rights activist in India. In the early 1980s, Watsa left his practice to work full-time in counselling and education.

Ask the Sexpert column
In 2005, aged 80, Watsa began writing a column called Ask the Sexpert for the newspaper Mumbai Mirror, which is noted for its witty replies to queries. The newspaper has subsequently been threatened with lawsuits and accusations of obscenity. Suchitra Dalvie, a gynaecologist, conducted a study by analysing more than 500 letters sent to the column. According to her, the study revealed a lack of sex education even among urban and relatively well-educated Indians. In August 2014, his editor estimated that he had received more than 40,000 queries for the column.

Death 
Watsa died in Mumbai on 28 December 2020, aged 96.

Awards
 2014 Dr. Ved Vyas Puri Award: On 17 June 2014, he was given this award by the Family Planning Association of India (FPAI) for his contributions to sex education in India.

Published papers

References

External links
 
 
 
 
 Ask the Sexpert (2017) - IMDb

1924 births
2020 deaths
20th-century Indian medical doctors
20th-century Indian non-fiction writers
21st-century Indian non-fiction writers
Indian columnists
Indian gynaecologists
Indian sexologists
Medical doctors from Punjab, India
People from Mumbai
Sex columnists
Sex educators
Writers from Mumbai